The 2003 Wilkes-Barre/Scranton Pioneers season was the team's second season as a member of the AF2.  The Pioneers finished third out of four in the American Conference Northeastern Division with a 6–10 record, the same as the year before, missing the playoffs for the second consecutive year.

Head coaches
Following the Pioneers' inaugural campaign, head coach Terry Karg decided not to renew his contract with the team.  Larry Kuharich, a former Tampa Bay Storm coach, was hired as the team's second coach.  However, shortly before the season started, Kuharich resigned and left the team for AF2 parent the Arena Football League.  Dean Cokinos filled the head coaching vacancy for the remainder of the season before resigning himself, leaving the Pioneers' head coaching position once again vacant.

Schedule

Regular season

Final standings

Attendance

References

External links
ArenaFan Online 2003 Wilkes-Barre/Pioneers schedule
ArenaFan Online 2003 af2 standings
ArenaFan Online 2003 af2 attendance

Wilkes-Barre/Scranton Pioneers seasons
2003 in American football
Wilkes-Barre Scranton Pioneers